Pichit Ketsro (born March 15, 1987) is a Thai professional footballer who plays as a right back for Ayutthaya United in the Thai League 2.

References

External links
 Profile at Goal
https://us.soccerway.com/players/pichit-ketsro/73326/

1987 births
Living people
Pichit Ketsro
Pichit Ketsro
Association football midfielders
Pichit Ketsro
Pichit Ketsro
Pichit Ketsro
Pichit Ketsro
Pichit Ketsro
Pichit Ketsro
Pichit Ketsro
Pichit Ketsro
Pichit Ketsro